The Women's Super-G in the 2020 FIS Alpine Skiing World Cup involved 6 events, which produced six different winners from five different countries. 

Defending champion Mikaela Shiffrin from the United States was leading the discipline standings when her father Jeff suffered what proved to be a fatal head injury at the start of February; Shiffrin immediately went home to Colorado and ended up missing the remainder of the season. Eventually, Swiss skier Corinne Suter, who held a slim 19-point lead over Federica Brignone of Italy with just the finals remaining, won the discipline title for 2020 when the finals, scheduled for Thursday, 19 March in Cortina d'Ampezzo, Italy, were cancelled due to the COVID-19 pandemic in Italy.

Standings

DNF = Did Not Finish
DNS = Did Not Start

See also
 2020 Alpine Skiing World Cup – Women's summary rankings
 2020 Alpine Skiing World Cup – Women's Overall
 2020 Alpine Skiing World Cup – Women's Downhill
 2020 Alpine Skiing World Cup – Women's Giant Slalom
 2020 Alpine Skiing World Cup – Women's Slalom
 2020 Alpine Skiing World Cup – Women's Combined
 2020 Alpine Skiing World Cup – Women's Parallel
 World Cup scoring system

References

External links
 Alpine Skiing at FIS website

Women's Super-G
FIS Alpine Ski World Cup women's Super-G discipline titles